The men's triple jump event  at the 1995 IAAF World Indoor Championships was held on 11–12 March.

Medalists

Results

Qualification
Qualification: 16.70 (Q) or at least 12 best performers (q) qualified for the final.

Final

References

Triple
Triple jump at the World Athletics Indoor Championships